Hans-Peter Koppe (born 2 February 1958) is a German rower who competed for East Germany in the 1980 Summer Olympics.

He was born in Leipzig. In 1980 he won the gold medal as crew member of the East German boat in the eights competition.

External links
 

1958 births
Living people
Olympic rowers of East Germany
Rowers at the 1980 Summer Olympics
Olympic gold medalists for East Germany
Sportspeople from Leipzig
Olympic medalists in rowing
East German male rowers
Medalists at the 1980 Summer Olympics
World Rowing Championships medalists for East Germany